In computing and computer science, a processor or processing unit is an electrical component (digital circuit) that performs operations on an external data source, usually memory or some other data stream. It typically takes the form of a microprocessor, which can be implemented on a single metal–oxide–semiconductor integrated circuit chip. In the past, processors were constructed using multiple individual vacuum tubes, multiple individual transistors, or multiple integrated circuits. Today, processors use built-in transistors.

The term is frequently used to refer to the central processing unit (CPU), the main processor in a system. However, it can also refer to other coprocessors, such as a graphics processing unit (GPU).

Traditional processors are typically based on silicon; however, researchers have developed experimental processors based on alternative materials such as carbon nanotubes, graphene, diamond, and alloys made of elements from groups three and five of the periodic table. Transistors made of a single sheet of silicon atoms one atom tall and other 2D materials have been researched for use in processors. Quantum processors have been created; they use quantum superposition to represent bits (called qubits) instead of only an on or off state.

Moore's law 

Moore's law, named after Gordon Moore, is the observation and projection via historical trend that the number of transistors in integrated circuits, and therefore processors by extension, doubles every two years. The progress of processors has followed Moore's law closely.

Types 
Central processing units (CPUs) are the primary processors in most computers. They are designed to handle a wide variety of general computing tasks rather than only a few domain-specific tasks. If based on the von Neumann architecture, they contain at least a control unit (CU), an arithmetic logic unit (ALU), and processor registers. In practice, CPUs in personal computers are usually also connected, through the motherboard, to a main memory bank, hard drive or other permanent storage, and peripherals, such as a keyboard and mouse.

Graphics processing units (GPUs) are present in many computers and designed to efficiently perform computer graphics operations, including linear algebra. They are highly parallel, and CPUs usually perform better on tasks requiring serial processing. Although GPUs were originally intended for use in graphics, over time their application domains have expanded, and they have become an important piece of hardware for machine learning.

There are several forms of processors specialized for machine learning. These fall under the category of AI accelerators (also known as neural processing units, or NPUs) and include vision processing units (VPUs) and Google's Tensor Processing Unit (TPU).

Sound chips and sound cards are used for generating and processing audio. Digital signal processors (DSPs) are designed for processing digital signals. Image signal processors are DSPs specialized for processing images in particular.

Physics processing units (PPUs) are built to efficiently make physics-related calculations, particularly in video games.

Field-programmable gate arrays (FPGAs) are specialized circuits that can be reconfigured for different purposes, rather than being locked into a particular application domain during manufacturing.

The Synergistic Processing Element or Unit (SPE or SPU) is a component in the Cell microprocessor.

Processors based on different circuit technology have been developed. One example is quantum processors, which use quantum physics to enable algorithms that are impossible on classical computers (those using traditional circuitry). Another example is photonic processors, which use light to make computations instead of semiconducting electronics. Processing is done by photodetectors sensing light produced by lasers inside the processor.

See also 
 Microprocessor
 Multi-core processor
 Central processing unit
 Graphics processing unit
 Superscalar processor
 Hardware acceleration
 Von Neumann architecture

References 

 
Electronic design